Margarites biconica is a species of sea snail, a marine gastropod mollusk in the family Margaritidae.

Description
The height of the shell attains 8 mm.

Distribution
This species occurs in the Weddell Sea, Antarctica, at depths between 155 m and 480 m.

References

 Numanami H. (1996) Taxonomic study on Antarctic gastropods collected by Japanese Antarctic Research Expeditions. Memoirs of National Institute of Polar Research, Series E, 39: 1–245.
 Engl W. (2012) Shells of Antarctica. Hackenheim: Conchbooks. 402 pp.

biconica
Gastropods described in 1996